Penn State Greater Allegheny (PSUGA) is a commonwealth campus of the Pennsylvania State University that sits on the border of McKeesport and White Oak in Pennsylvania.

History
As early as 1934, the Pennsylvania State College has offered technical courses in the Pittsburgh and McKeesport region to train industry workers for the booming technology and steel industries surrounding Pittsburgh. In 1948, the Penn State McKeesport Center opened in Dravosburg, offering courses in occupational training and self-enrichment for returning veterans. The center eventually moved to McKeesport in 1952 and established complete associate degree programs with the first graduates in 1955.

Also in 1955, a group of area businessmen formed the Penn State McKeesport Advisory Board whose purpose was to search for a permanent location for the McKeesport Center. In 1957, the current location was obtained and the main building was constructed. Since then, Penn State Greater Allegheny continues to play a large role in education the population of the Greater Pittsburgh area.

Originally Penn State McKeesport, the Penn State Board of Trustees initially voted to rename the campus to Penn State Greater Allegheny during its September 2006 meeting. The board subsequently approved the current name in January 2007.

Academics
Penn State Greater Allegheny offers a number of two- and four-year degree programs that students can start and finish on the campus. Penn State Greater Allegheny also offers a 3+1 program in energy engineering; students spend three years at Greater Allegheny, and transition to University Park for the fourth year to complete the program.

2+2 Plan
Nearly all of Penn State's 275+ baccalaureate degree programs can be started at Penn State Greater Allegheny. Students may complete their first two years at Greater Allegheny before transitioning to a different Penn State campus to complete their studies.  Approximately 60% of all Penn State students enter the university through the 2+2 plan.

Honors program
Penn State Greater Allegheny offers an honors program which has many benefits such as early class registration, special library privileges, small class sizes and advanced research projects. Students that are a part of this program may earn honors credits by taking honors courses, participating in honors options or pursuing independent studies.

Admission to the honors program is by invitation and based on quality of academic performance as well as experiences outside of the classroom. Eligible incoming first year students will receive a letter of invitation during the admission process. For current students, the invitation is made by the Honors Committee at the end of each academic year.

Each honors student must meet the set requirements each year to remain a part of the program. Generally, a student must maintain a 3.33 GPA, complete at least one honors course each semester and participate in activities sponsored by the honors program.

Campus

Main Building, 1957
Constructed in 1957, Main building was the first building on campus. Formerly containing the campus administrative offices, Main now houses the education, English, communications, psychology and other liberal arts departments as well as the continuing education office and three multimedia equipped classrooms.
Crawford Building, 1959
Crawford is the technology hub of campus, containing three computer labs, the technology help desk and the digital commons (funded by the Digital Commons Initiative) as well as two large multimedia equipped classrooms and the offices for the Theatre Department. The building was named after George Crawford.
The Crawford computer labs include over 80 computers with a mix of Macintosh and PC platforms. The computer labs can also double as classrooms and contain digital projectors.
Frable Building, 1969
Named in honor of Milton Frable, the first campus advisory board president, Frank Building houses most of the campus administration offices including the chancellor's office, academic affairs, admissions and police services. The second and third floors are home to the business, engineering, information sciences and technology, and mathematics departments along with several classrooms and technology related labs. In addition, many guest speakers and special performances are held in Frank's multi-room conference center on the first floor.
Wunderley Gymnasium, 1971
Named in honor of John M. Wunderley, the Wunderley Gymnasium contains both classrooms and faculty offices in addition to the gymnasium. The building is located directly across from McKeesport Hall on a hill overlooking the center of campus.
Kelly Library, 1972
The Kelly Library contains the campus library as well as the Ladrin Learning Center and the Academic and Cultural Enrichment (ACE) program. Some computers are also available for student use.
Ostermayer Laboratory, 1972
Ostermayer houses the biology and chemistry departments. In addition to several dedicated lab classrooms, there is a large multimedia equipped classroom used for science as well as psychology and CTE (state vocational education program) lectures.
The Student Community Center, 2003
The new Student Community Center, commonly referred to as the SCC, was constructed in 2003 with a total cost of $5.5 Million. The building is located at the center of campus and contains the dining commons as well as the student book store, game room with pool table, campus radio station and the Student Government Association (SGA). The SCC features many student and campus programs ranging from live music and theatre productions to guest speakers and job fairs.
The Lion Shrine, 2003
The campus Lion Shrine was dedicated on October 18, 2003 as a result of a gift from the alumni association. The shrine is located at the front of the Student Community Center and is open to the public for pictures.

Campus housing
Penn State Greater Allegheny is a residential campus, offering housing for 200 students in McKeesport Hall.

Athletics

Varsity sports

Penn State Greater Allegheny offers many different varsity sports including baseball, men's and women's basketball, men's and women's soccer, softball, women's volleyball, men's and women's cross country, and track and field.

Intramural sports
For students interested in playing a sport but not wanting to join a varsity team, various intramural leagues and activities are held throughout the academic year. Some of these intramural sports include flag football, indoor soccer, and men's and women's volleyball.

Fitness facilities
A new fitness center was constructed at Penn State Greater Allegheny in the spring of 2005. The fitness center is located next to McKeesport Hall and contains a variety of fitness equipment. Some of the equipment includes: treadmills, exercise bikes, ellipticals, free weights and weight machines.

Student clubs
Many student run organizations are active at PSUGA. There is an involvement fair held at the beginning of every semester where current and prospective clubs recruit new members. Some active clubs include:
Absence (Literary Magazine)
Black Student Union (BSU)
Collegian (Student Newspaper)
Lion Ambassadors
Pep Band
Psychology Club
Health Sciences Club
Residence Hall Council
Student Government Association (SGA)
WMKP Radio

References

External links

Official website
Official athletics website

Educational institutions established in 1952
Pennsylvania State University colleges
Universities and colleges in Allegheny County, Pennsylvania
USCAA member institutions
McKeesport, Pennsylvania
1952 establishments in Pennsylvania
Greater Allegheny